The Palais Bourbon is the meeting place of the National Assembly, the lower legislative chamber of the French Parliament. It is located in the 7th arrondissement of Paris, on the Rive Gauche of the Seine, across from the Place de la Concorde.

The original palace was built beginning in 1722 for Louise Françoise de Bourbon, Duchess of Bourbon, the legitimised daughter of Louis XIV and the Marquise de Montespan. Four successive architects – Lorenzo Giardini, Pierre Cailleteau, Jean Aubert and Jacques Gabriel – completed the palace in 1728. It was then nationalised during the French Revolution. From 1795 to 1799, during the Directory, it was the meeting place of the Council of Five Hundred, which chose the government leaders. Beginning in 1806, during Napoleon's French Empire, Bernard Poyet's Neoclassical facade was added to mirror that of the Church of the Madeleine, facing it across the Seine beyond the Place de la Concorde.

The complex includes the Hôtel de Lassay, on the west side of the Palais Bourbon; it is the official residence of the President of the National Assembly.

History

An aristocratic  country house in Paris (1726–1789)

The palace was built for Louise Françoise de Bourbon, Duchess of Bourbon (1673–1743), the legitimised daughter of Louis XIV and Madame de Montespan. Begun in 1722 and finished in 1728, it was located in what was then a largely rural quarter at the edge of Paris, which was about to become a very fashionable residential neighborhood, the Faubourg Saint-Germain. Until that time, the area, called the Pré-au-Clercs, was a wooded area popular for fighting duels. After the death of Louis XIV in 1715, following the example of the Regent, the aristocracy began to move their residences from Versailles back to Paris. Building-space land was scarce in the traditional residential area of the nobility, the densely-populated Marais, so the aristocracy of the Regency looked for land with space for gardens at the edges of the city, either near the Champs-Élysées on the right bank or on the left bank.

The Duchess of Bourbon had been known for frivolity at the Court in Versailles, but by the 1720s, she had had seven children and was widowed.  The reputed lover of the Duchess, Armand de Madaillan de Lesparre, Count of Lassy (Comte de Lassay), proposed the site of the palace to her;  he had purchased land next door along the Seine, and the two buildings were constructed at the same time. The parcel of land for the new palace was large, extending from the Seine to the rue de l'Université.

The original plan called for a country residence surrounded by gardens, modeled after the Grand Trianon palace at Versailles, designed by Jules Hardouin Mansart, the chief architect of Louis XIV. The Italian architect Lorenzo Giardini made the first plan, but he died in 1722, having made little but the first sketches. The project was taken over by Pierre Cailleteau, also known as Lassurance, who had been an assistant to Hardouin-Mansart. Cailleteau had worked on the palace of Versailles and Les Invalides, and he knew the royal style very well, but he died in 1724. He was replaced by Jean Aubert, also a former assistant of Hardouin-Mansart. Aubert had built one of the grandest projects of the time, the stables of the royal residence at Chantilly. In the meanwhile, the construction of the neighbouring Hôtel de Lassay had begun, following a plan by another noted architect, Jacques Gabriel, the designer of the buildings around the Place de la Concorde. Both buildings were finished in 1728.

Both the Palais Bourbon and the Hôtel de Lassay were in the Italian style, with roofs hidden by balustrades and invisible from street level.  The Palais Bourbon was in a U-shape. The main building was parallel to the Seine, with two wings enclosing a courtyard. The entrance to the courtyard and building was on the Rue de la Université. The entrance to the courtyard had an ornate archway, flanked by two pavilions.  The Hôtel de Lassay was rectangular, and more modest in size. The two buildings had identical facades facing the Seine. The facades featured alternating columns and windows, and decoration on the themes of the seasons, the elements, and, fitting for the daughter of the Sun King, about Apollo. The space between the buildings, and between the buildings and the Seine, was filled with gardens. In addition to the large reception rooms, the interior of the house had many small salons which could be arranged for a variety of purposes. It also had a novelty for buildings of the period; corridors, so one could pass through the building without walking through the rooms. None of the original apartments of the Duchess survive; they were demolished in the subsequent remodelings. The Duchesse de Bourbon died in 1743, and De Lassay died in 1750. The Palace was purchased by Louis XV, who seems to have wished to include it in the plan of the new place Royale (now the Place de la Concorde)  which he was building on the other side of the river.  But in 1756 he sold it to grandson of the Duchess,  Louis Joseph, Prince of Condé, who had been a military hero in the just-concluded Seven Years' War. The Prince decided to largely rebuild it, turning it from a country house into a monumental palace, in the new classical revival style. With this end in mind, in 1768 he purchased the neighboring Hôtel de Lassay, and planned to make the two buildings into one.  A new plan was drawn by Marie-Joseph Peyre, whose style was based on archeological studies of ancient Rome and Greece. Peyre's other neoclassical works included the Odéon Theater.  Several different architects were engaged in the project, including for Jacques-Germain Soufflot, Bellisard and Charpentier.

For the neoclassical palace of the Prince, the entrance on rue Université was replaced by a larger and more impressive gate, framed by a gallery of columns. The two wings of the building were extended, and a pavilion was created with apartments for one of his sons.  An abundance of military decoration, including stucco sculptures of shields and weapons, was added to the vestibule, and are still visible today.  The palace was only finished at the end of the 1780s, when the French Revolution swept away the old regime.  The Prince went into exile, and the two residences were confiscated by the state in 1792.

The Revolution, Consulate and Empire (1789–1814)

The first French national assembly gathered without royal authorization on 20 June 1789 in the tennis court of the Palace of Versailles. the first step of the French Revolution, and in May 1793 moved to the empty theater of the Tuileries Palace in Paris. The aristocracy fled into exile, and the Palais Bourbon and Hôtel de Lassay, like the Luxembourg Palace, Élysée Palace and Hôtel Matignon were nationalized, and used for government functions.  The stables of the Palais became the headquarters of the administration of military transport, while the Palais Bourbon became in 1794 the Central School of Public Works, which later became, under Napoleon, the École Polytechnique, the famous military engineering school.

In 1793 and 1794 the Revolution reached its peak of fury,  under the Convention led by Robespierre and Saint-Just.  The two leaders of the Terror were arrested and executed on 28 July 1794, and a new government, the Directory took power.  On 23 September 1795 a new Constitution was adopted, which called for a parliament with two chambers, the Council of Five Hundred, the future National Assembly, and the Council of the Ancients. The Council of Five Hundred was given the Palais Bourbon as its future meeting place.  The new government commissioned the architects Jacques-Pierre Gisors and Emmanuel-Cherubin Leconte to turn the apartments of the Palace along the Seine into a suitable meeting chamber. The chamber they designed was in the shape of a hemicycle, similar to a Roman theater. it was covered with a cupola modeled after that of the amphitheater of the Academy of Surgery,  located not far away in Saint-Germain-des-Pres, which had been built between 1769 and 1774. The first session of the Council took place on 21 January 1798. It was quickly discovered that the acoustics of the new chamber were poor. A few other changes were made to the Palace;  a vestibule and rotunda was added on the courtyard, and a wooden gallery was constructed to connect the Palace with the Hotel de Lassay.

Two  features of the original chamber can still be found in the new New Chamber; the desk and armchair of the President of the Assembly, made of wood and gilded bronze, designed in a classical Roman by Jacques-Louis David and the bas-relief behind the tribune, made of carved white marble framed in dark polychrome marble. It features two female figures representing allegorical figures of History and Fame.  Fame is announcing the laws with a long trumpet, while History is inscribing them on a tablet. In the center is a bust of Marianne, the symbol of the Republic, wearing a medallion of the Roman god Janus, whose two faces illustrate the motto that the experience of the past predicts the future. The construction of the Chamber drastically modified the building, as the roof had to be raised well above the old facade. It was also out of alignment with the long axis composed of the Church of the Madeleine, the place de la Concorde, and the pont de la Concorde;  the view of the Palais Bourbon from the Place de la Concorde was blocked by the decoration of the bridge.

The Council of Five Hundred began meeting on 21 January 1798, a date chosen because it was the anniversary of the execution of the "last tyrant", Louis XVI. The members arrived dressed in Roman togas and caps, in the neoclassical fashion. They found that the new Chamber had little ventilation, was feebly heated in winter, and the acoustics were made it hard to hear the speakers. The acoustics in the end made little difference, because on 8 November 1799, Napoleon Bonaparte organized a coup d'état and seized power from the Council of Five Hundred, then meeting at the Chateau of Saint-Cloud. Napoleon formed a new legislature, the Corps Legislatif, whose only duty was to listen to an annual speech by Napoleon, the new First Consul, and to adopt the laws proposed by the Council of State, and debated by another new body, the Tribunat.

While Napoleon gave the new legislature little power, he did give their building a new grandeur. In 1806 the Bureau of the Corps Legislatif proposed the construction of a new facade facing the Seine, which would be aligned with and would match that of the Temple of Glory (now the Church of the Madeleine) which Napoleon was building at the end of  Rue Royale, to the north of the Place de la Concorde. The new neoclassical facade, designed by architect Bernard Poyet, had twelve corinthian columns in an entirely different style from Italianate 18th century palace behind it, but it was high enough to be visible from the Place de la Concorde and was correctly aligned to be visible from the Madeleine. The original fronton of the facade featured bas-reliefs by sculptor Antoine-Denis Chaudet, showed scenes from the opening of the Corps Legislative in 1806; it showed Napoleon on horseback, offering to the members of the Legislature the flags which had been captured from the Austrians at the Battle of Austerlitz, and the inscription, "To Napoleon I the Great – the Corps Legislatif". In 1810, statues of the goddess Themis, holding a scale in her left hand, and Athena, the symbol of wisdom, were placed in front of the facade on the Seine, along with statues of famous French royal ministers,  Maximilien de Béthune, Duke of Sully, Jean-Baptiste Colbert, and Henri François d'Aguesseau, Poyet made two important modifications to the interior;  he added two salons, the Salle des Gardes and the Salon de l'Empereur, which was intended for the use of Napoleon during his rare visits to the building.  Both these rooms retain much of their original decor, tromp-l'oeil paintings by Alexandre-Évariste Fragonard, the son of the famous court painter of Louis XIV.

Bourbon Restoration and monarchy of Louis-Philippe -the Chamber of Deputies

After the fall of Napoleon in 1814, the Bourbon monarchy was restored under Louis XVIII, but preserved some of the democratic institutions begun during the Revolution. The new government, like the Directory, featured a legislature with two houses, the Chamber of Deputies and the Senate. The Palais Bourbon was formally returned to its aristocratic owner, the Prince of Condé, who had returned from exile. However, the building had been so modified it was impossible to use as a residence; the Prince rented a large part of the Palace to the new Chamber of Deputies. The first modification made by the new government, in July, 1815, just a month after Napoleon's final defeat at Waterloo, was to erase the inscription to Napoleon, the five bas-reliefs and the numerous Ns and eagles that had been carved on the facades. The bas-relief featuring Napoleon on tn the Seine facade was replaced by a plaster bas relief by Alexandre-Évariste Fragonard of Louis XVIII signing the Charter of 1814, the founding document of the new government. The Chamber of Deputies continued to rent the space until 1827, when it finally bought the building from the heir of the Prince of Condé in 1827, for 5,250,000 francs.

The meeting hall was in deplorable condition, so the Chamber decided on a major renovation. The architect Jules de Joly (1788–1865) who had been official architect of the Chamber since 1821, was selected for the task. The architect proposed four possible new shapes for the hall; an ellipse, rectangle, octagon and hemicycle, but the Chamber decided to keep the original hemicycle. De Joly also was asked to redesign the three salons which faced on the courtyard of honor. The plan was submitted in January 1828, approved in April 1829, the first stone placed on 4 November 1829.  Over three hundred workers were engaged on the project, one of the largest undertaken in Paris during the Restoration.  Work continued, despite the Revolution of 1830 that brought down the Bourbon Monarchy, and replaced it with a new Constitutional Monarchy.  Louis Philippe, the new King, came to take the oath to the Chamber in its temporary meeting place.  A second project, that of constructing a library, was commenced April 1831. The new interior was completed in September 1832, and formally inaugurated by the new monarch on 19 November 1832.

The meeting hall of the Deputies kept the same hemicycle form, but the floor was lowered,  giving greater height to the ceiling, and increasing the height of the tribune and the desk of the President. A colonnade and balconies, in the form of an arch of triumph, was constructed behind the tribune, giving the appearance of a theatrical stage. The central panel above and behind the tribune was occupied by a large painting of Louis-Philippe taking his oath before the Assembly. Niches were constructed on either side of the tribune, with statues of "Liberty" and "Public Order" by Pradet. The four columns of the arch were decorated with statues representing Force, Justice, Prudence and Eloquence.

The plan by Joly also turned the building around.  Under Napoleon, the main entrance, where the Emperor entered for his annual address, was on the Seine, under the grand colonnade. Under the new plan, the main entrance was placed on the courtyard of honor, where a delegation of deputies met the new monarch, Louis-Philippe, when he came to the building each year to open the session. To give this entrance greater prominence, Joly constructed a neoclassical portico with four Corinthian columns, modeled after the ancient Roman temple of Jupiter Stator.  Joly's project greatly increased the interior space of the building, adding three new salons (now the Salons Delacroix, Casimir-Pierier, Abel-de-Pujol.  Under the new plan, it was possible to go from one wing of the building to the other without having to cross the courtyard or pass through the meeting chamber. 
 
In 1837 a new project was begun to finish the exterior decoration, particularly on the facade facing the Seine. The original three bas-reliefs on the facade beneath the colonnade had been removed with the fall of the Empire, and were not replaced; but two new works replaced other Napoleonic bas reliefs; Prometheus animating the arts by Rude and Public Education by James Pradier. The bas-relief on the Fronton, which had originally depicted Napoleon bringing the flags of Austerlitz to the Assembly, was replaced by a new work by Corton entitled France supported by Force and Justice. For the new entry portico on the court of honor, Joly commissioned two new statues by Gayard; titled France and Liberty. These two statues were not installed until 1860,  under Napoleon III, and were given new names;  "Force"  and France deposits her ballot in the voting urn.

The interior minister of Louis-Philippe, and future President of France, Adolphe Thiers, oversaw the interior decoration of the Assembly.  He selected a promising young painter Eugène Delacroix, just 25 years old, to paint murals for the Salon of the King (Salon du Roi), though the King, Louis-Philippe, in fact detested Delacroix's style. Between 1833 and 1838 Delacroix created a series of allegorical figures representing Justice, Truth, Prudence, War, Industry, and Agriculture. The murals are preserved in what is now called the Salon Delacroix.   Another Salon, known as the Salon de la Paix or Salon des pas perdus, was decorated with allegories by Horace Vernet, illustrating two themes important to Louis Philippe;  peace in Europe and the expansion of commerce and industry. They showed French ships carrying goods from the new French colonies in Africa, ships in the port of Marseille, the textile mills of Lyon, and a locomotive of the new railways. A third salon was painted by Abel de Pujol, who painted scenes from the history of governments in France, from Charlemagne to Louis-Philippe.

The project of reconstruction included a new library, on the east side of the Palace. The style was highly classical, and resembled that of the ancient Roman baths; pillars supported five cupolas, over a gallery closed by two semi-circular bays. The lighting came from a recent innovation, skylights; it was later copied in the new National Library of France.  The painter Eugène Delacroix was commissioned to paint the interior, a project which lasted from 1838 until 1846.  Supported by a team of assistants, Delacroix painted the five cupolas and the two hemicycles of the library with a series of allegorical paintings on the themes of philosophy, natural history, legislation, eloquence, literature, poetry and theology; a panorama of all the aspects of civilization.

Despite the new construction, the Chamber of Deputies was still desperately short of space for meeting rooms and offices. The President of the Parliament lived far from the Palace – first on rue de Lille, then on Place Vendôme;  and the Duke of Bourbon still occupied the west wing of the Palais. The Chamber purchased the west wing of the Palace in 1830, and the Hôtel de Lassay in 1843. Joly once again was the architect chosen to redo the building;  his plan called adding another story and restoring, as much as possible, the original italianate style, both inside and outside. The result was a building which was more intimate and elegant than its neoclassical neighbor.   The work was begun in 1845, and was nearly finished when the 1848 French Revolution broke out.  After days of turmoil and fighting, the King abdicated and departed France, and the Chamber of Deputies was dissolved, opening the way for the French Second Republic.

The Second Republic and Second Empire  (1848–1870)

Following the Revolution in February 1848, France and its legislature entered a turbulent period. The enormous painting of Louis Philippe taking his oath to the nation, over the tribune in the Chamber of Deputies was taken down, and replaced by a Gobelin tapestry of the painting of Raphael, The School of Athens, made between 1683 and 1688. The Chamber of Deputies elected in 1846 was abruptly disbanded by the February Revolution. A new election by direct universal suffrage chose a Constituent Assembly. The Constituent Assembly  met for the first time in the temporary chamber which had been constructed  in the garden of the Palais Bourbon, and the on 4 May the French Second Republic was proclaimed at the Palais Bourbon. On May 15 a mob with red flags invaded the chamber, demanding a much more radical government. Another unsuccessful attempt to seize the government was launched by in June 1848. A new National Assembly was elected, and a new President, Louis Napoleon Bonaparte, the nephew of the Emperor, who had lived most of his life in exile. On December 2, 1851, when the Assembly refused to change the Constitution to allow him to run for a second term, Louis Napoleon organized a coup d'état, took power, and had himself proclaimed Emperor Napoleon III, bringing an end to the Second Republic. Opposition deputies were arrested and exiled. The Assembly continued to meet in the Palais Bourbon, but had little influence over the Emperor or the government. They were not allowed to speak from the Tribune, but only from the floor of the Chamber.

After 1860, the Emperor liberalized the regime, giving the deputies greater influence, freedom of speech and the press was reestablished, and debates resumed in the Palais Bourbon.  In 1870, the Assembly voted with patriotic enthusiasm for a war with Prussia, despite the opposition of a few deputies, including Adolphe Thiers, but in a matter of weeks the French army was defeated, the Emperor was captured, and on 2–3 September the French Third Republic was founded.

The Third Republic  (1871–1940) 

After the defeat at Sedan, A provisional government of Parliament leaders was formed, and tried to continue the war, but Paris was soon surrounded by the Germans.  The leader of the provisional government, Léon Gambetta, had to escape from Paris by balloon. The Palais Bourbon was abandoned; the Assembly moved first to Bordeaux, then to Versailles. The Paris Commune seized power  in the city in March 1871, but in May was suppressed by the French Army. The Palais Bourbon escaped destruction, unlike the Tuileries Palace, Hotel de Ville, the Palace of Justice, State Council and other government buildings, which were set afire in the last days of the Commune.  While the French Senate returned to Paris soon after the suppression of the Commune, the Assembly remained in Versailles until 27 November 1879.

The new Assembly of the Third Republic was considerably larger than that of early governments, with 531 deputies, compared with 260 under the Second Empire. The new President of the Chamber, Léon Gambetta, called for a study and plan to enlarge the meeting space. A long series of enlargement plans were considered between 1879 and 1913, but none were ever approved.

During the Third Republic, the Palais Bourbon was the home of the primary institution of the French government. The Assembly selected the President of France, and controlled finances and foreign policy. Its membership divided between constitutional monarchists and conservatives, who sat to the right of the Chamber as seen from the podium, and the moderate and radical republicans and later socialists, who sat to the left. The chamber saw many eloquent and spirited debates between the leaders of the parties, and sometimes turmoil. In 1898, during the Dreyfus affair, the socialist leader Jean Jaurès was struck by a monarchist deputy while giving a speech in the Chamber,  and a bomb placed by an anarchist exploded in the gallery in 1890. The Assembly declared war in 1914 and celebrated victory in 1918, but was badly divided in the 1930s and was unable to manage the economic crisis and the approach of World War II.

World War II, and the Fourth and Fifth Republics

In June 1940, as the German army approached the capital, the government and Assembly abandoned Paris and moved first to Tours, then to Bordeaux, and then, under the Pétain Government, to Vichy. The Germans used the Palais Bourbon as the military court for the Luftwaffe, and it also housed the offices of the French bureau which sent French workers to factories in Germany. German propaganda banners decorated the Seine facade of the Palace. During the liberation of Paris in August 1944, parts of the Palace were badly damaged. A fire in the library started by the fighting destroyed twenty thousand books. Philippe de Gaulle, the son of Charles de Gaulle was sent from Montparnasse Station on 25 August 1944 with orders for the Germans troops entrenched within National Assembly at the Palais Bourbon to surrender. Despite the risk of being killed, alone and unarmed, he negotiated their surrender.

The Fourth Republic was founded by the adoption of a new Constitution in 1946, and brought new technology to the Palais Bourbon, including the first microphones for speakers, but featured a large number of political parties and unstable coalitions which frequently collapsed.  The Algerian Crisis of 1956 brought an end to the Fourth Republic, the approval of a new Constitution, and the adoption of the Fifth Republic, still in existence today.

The Palais Bourbon today

The Court of Honor

The Court of Honor, to the south of the Palais, has been the main entrance since the original palace was constructed.  It was considerably modified in the 1830s,  with the addition of the ceremonial portico over the doorway, but still retains its original outlines. The sculptures on either side of the entrance represent Universal Suffrage and the Law.  They  were added during the Second Empire in 1860.  The granite ball on a pedestal in the center of the courtyard, called the Sphere of Human Rights, is by the American sculptor Walter De Maria.  It  was added in 1989 to commemorate the bicentennial of the French Revolution.

The Meeting Chamber

The salle des Séances, or meeting chamber of the Palais Bourbon, has the same basic appearance and arrangement as it did in 1832. By the French Constitution, the Assembly is in session for nine months, from the beginning of October until the end of June, though the deputies can be summoned at any time for a special session by the President of the Republic. The 577 deputies, elected for five-year terms, are seated in the hemicycle, with the deputies of the socialists and other parties of the left seated to the left of the speaker, and those of the more conservative parties to the right. The President of the Assembly is seated in the Perchoir, or perch, a desk high up against the wall of the chamber, at the height of the highest back row, symbolizing that the President is a deputy like the others.  The armchair was designed by Jacques-Louis David for the Council of Five Hundred, the first legislature to meet in the building.

Deputies vote electronically, by pushing a button, and the count is displayed at the front of the Chamber. The sessions of the Chamber are open to the public (though access must be requested through the office of a deputy). The sessions are also transmitted live on the Internet site of the Assembly.

The Salons

The salons of the Palais Bourbon were created during the reign of Louis-Philippe, and were decorated by prominent artists, most notably Eugène Delacroix. 
The Salle Casimir-Périer is a wide corridor with a vaulted ceiling which connects the Assembly Chamber with the salons and with the Courtyard of Honor.  The architecture is inspired by that of an ancient Roman basilica. Its primary decoration is a massive bronze bas-relief depicting the first meetings of the Assembly during the French Revolution, by sculptor Jules Dalou. It was originally designed for a monument to the Revolution that was never constructed, and then, at the request of Assembly President Leon Gambetta, cast in bronze for the Palais Bourbon. It is 6.5 meters long and 2.3 meters high, and weighs four tons. The hall also includes six statues of illustrious members of the Assembly by different themes:  statues of Mirabeau and Maximilien Sébastien Foy representing resistance to absolute governments; statues of Jean Sylvain Bailly and Casimir Périer representing resistance to popular sedition; and statues celebrating the authors of the French Civil Code, Jean-Étienne-Marie Portalis and François Denis Tronchet. The decoration also includes bas-reliefs under the ceiling at either end representing Law as the protector, and law avenging injustice. The lunettes illuminating the hall also have sculptural decoration, representing Meditation, Justice, Peace, Work, Industry, Commerce, Force, War, Maritime commerce and Agriculture. This hall is the place where members of the Government gather before going into the Chamber on Tuesdays and Wednesdays, when they answer questions from the Deputies.
The Salon Delacroix was decorated by Delacroix beginning when the artist was just twenty-five years old.  It was originally called the Salon de Roi, and was meant as a place where Louis-Philippe could meet with the Deputies when he came to the Chamber. The work was completed in 1836. The dominant elements of the decoration are four allegorical figures which according to Delacroix symbolized "the living forces of the State; Justice, Agriculture, Industry and War". Two grisaille allegorical paintings of the Ocean and the Mediterranean decorate the west wall.  The niche between these paintings originally held the throne used by Louis-Philippe during his visits to the Palais Bourbon.   This salon is now used as a gathering place for Deputies of the Left, whose seats are just inside, and often informal parliamentary negotiation takes place here.
The Salle des Pas-Perdus originally contained a bedroom and baths in the residence of the Duchess. It was transformed into a formal hall during the reign of Louis-Philippe, and decorated with paintings by Horace Vernet and Charles Séchan, finished in 1839. The centerpiece of the decoration by Vernet is the painting Peace distributes her benefits, flanked by The Genius of steam, representing a steam railroad locomotive, newly introduced to France; and the Genius of Steam chasing the gods of the Sea, featuring a steamship. Following a tradition begun under Louis Phillipe, the President of the Assembly walks through this room on his way from the Hotel de Lassay to the afternoon session in the Hemicycle.  When he arrives in the room, drums sound and he walks through two ranks of Republican Guards with swords, saluting his passage.
The Salon Abel de Pujol was created and decorated in 1838–40 under Louis Philippe. It takes its name from the neoclassic artist Abel de Pujol who painted the grisailles on the ceiling, which illustrate the role of French monarchs in the establishment of law;  Clovis I, the author of the first French laws;  Charlemagne; Louis IX (Saint Louis); and Louis-Philippe himself, by the charter of 1830, which established his government. Today the Salon is used especially as a gathering place for deputies of the right during sessions of the Assembly, where they negotiate last-minute changes and tactics.
The Salon des quatre colonnes is decorated with several works of sculpture which originally stood in the chamber of the Council of 500 in 1798, and were removed during the reconstruction of 1832;  statues of ancient legislators; Brutus, Lycurgus, Solomon and Cato. On either side of the doorway to the Assembly Chamber are busts of two famous deputies symbolizing the right and the left;  the Christian Democrat Albert de Mun and the socialist Jean Jaurès. A marble monument shows the names of Deputies killed in the First World War, and a statue of the Republic commemorates the Deputies and Assembly officers who died in the Second World War.   The room is used today during Assembly session for stand-up television interviews with Deputies.<ref>Brault, Yoann, article in 'L'Assemblee Nationale (2012), Beaux Arts Editions</ref>

The Library

The  Library was built beginning in 1830 against the side of the original Palais. The design is architect Jules de Joly, in the style of the ancient Roman baths. with pillars supporting five cupolas, which provide light. It is closed at either end by curved bays. The decoration, by Eugène Delacroix and a team of assistants, was done between 1838 and 1847.  The paintings on the ceiling around each of the cupolas represents a different branch of human knowledge;  poetry; theology, legislation, philosophy and the sciences.  The stories that illustrate the themes were taken from antiquity, rather than from French history.  They represent the great thinkers (Ovid, Demosthenes, Herodotus, and Aristotle, as well as scenes representing the dangers to democracy and civilization; the death of Saint John the Baptist, the death of Seneca the Younger, and the murder of Archimedes by a Roman soldier.  The large paintings on the bays at either end of the room represent Orpheus bringing the benefits of the arts and civilization and Attila and his barbarian hordes at the feet of Italy and the Arts.The original collection of the library was assembled from books confiscated from the libraries of the clergy and aristocracy who left Paris during the Revolution.  It also includes many rare items donated to the Assembly, including the minutes of the trial of Joan of Arc, the manuscripts of Jean-Jacques Rousseau, donated by his widow in 1794, and the Codex Borbonicus, an Aztec codex written by Aztec priests shortly before or after the Spanish conquest of the Aztec Empire.   The library is reserved for he use of the members of the Assembly and their staffs, and is not open to the public.

The Salle des Conferences  and Deputies Buffet
 
The Salle des Conferences is a large room with tables and lamps on the east side of the Hemicycle, where the Deputies can read, talk and check their messages. It was originally the dining room of the Prince de Condé, then was transformed in 1830 into its present use. The ceiling is richly decorated with paintings by Heim on the history of the monarchy and parliaments, and on by the fireplace are large  historical paintings on parliamentary subjects; Philip le Bel Brings assembles the Estates General in the Cathedral of Notre-Dame by Auguste Vinchon, and The Patriotic Devotion of the Bourgeois of Calais by Ary Scheffer.

Next to the Salles des Conferences is the Deputies Buffet, which was created in 1994 in the Belle Époque style and renovated in the same style in 1997.  It is reserved exclusively for the use of Deputies and former Deputies.

Hôtel de Lassay

The adjacent Hôtel de Lassay, connected by a gallery to the Palais Bourbon, serves as the official residence of the National Assembly's president. The building underwent a major reconstruction in 1846–48 (see history), adding an additional story, but the 18th century style of the exterior and interior layout of the building was preserved.

The Cabinet du Départ takes its name from its function; the President of the Assembly departs from this room when a bell announces that the 3:00 p.m. session of the Assembly is about to begin. The room is lavishly decorated with a carpet from the period of Louis XIV, originally in Grand Gallery of the Louvre Palace; and a tapestry which reproduces that tapestry of the School of Athens by Raphael which hangs over President's seat in the Assembly Chamber. The room was the original study of the house before the Revolution. The desk was brought from the Chateau of Versailles in 1794 during the Revolution for the use of the Committee of Public Safety.

The Salon des Jeux is a conference room on the ground floor of the residence, where the President of the Assembly meets with other Assembly leaders to set the agenda for the sessions. It takes its name from an illustration over the door of a game of lawn bowling, by the 18th century artist Heim.

The Salle des fetes and Galerie des tapisseries are located in the building that connects the Hotel de Lassay with the Palais Bourbon.  The Salle des fetes was built between 1846 and 1849, replacing an early wooden passage built in 1809. It is used today for expositions, ceremonies for visiting dignitaries, and the annual New Years greeting by the President of the Assembly.  The Gallery of Tapestries was created in 1860, during the Second Empire, to display a collection of paintings.  The paintings were removed in 1865, and replaced in 1900 by a set of nine Beauvais tapestries.

Contemporary Art

The Palais Bourbon contains several installations of  contemporary art.  One is a work of modern sculpture, a large granite sphere on a marble pedestal, by the American sculptor Walter De Maria,  which was installed in the Courtyard of Honor in 1989, to mark the 200th anniversary of the French Revolution.  His design was selected after an international competition;  the granite sphere contains a small heart made of gold.

A work by the Belgian artist Pierre Alechinsky  created in 1992, occupies a small rotunda along the passageway between the Hotel de Lassay and the Palais Bourbon.  It is titled "The Fragile Garden" and illustrates the words of  the poet Jean Tardieu: "Men search for the light in a fragile garden where the colors tremble."

The Salon of Marianne, created in 2004, displays busts of Marianne, the symbol of the Republic from different periods and in different styles.  It displays, since 2015, a work by the American graffiti artist JonOne, called Liberté, Egalité, Fraternité, based on Delacroix's famous Liberty Leading the People;''  it symbolizes Youth, the Future and Hope.

There are other notable contemporary works on display in the Palais Bourbon by Hervé Di Rosa, Djamel Tatah, Vincent Barré and Fabienne Verdier.

See also
Luxembourg Palace, the seat of the French Senate
National Assembly (France)
 List of works by James Pradier Sculpture

Notes and citations

Bibliography

External links

Palais Bourbon – a palace for democracy, Secretariat-General of the National Assembly – Communication and multimedia information department
History of the Palais Bourbon
Connaissance de l'Assemblée: histoire et génie des lieux (in French)

Bourbon
Legislative buildings in Europe
Seats of national legislatures
National Assembly (France)
Buildings and structures in the 7th arrondissement of Paris
Neoclassical architecture in Paris